The Drunkard; or, The Fallen Saved is an American temperance play first performed on February 12, 1844. A drama in five acts, it was perhaps the most popular play produced in the United States until the dramatization of Uncle Tom's Cabin  premiered in 1853. In New York City, P.T. Barnum presented it at his American Museum in a run of over 100 performances. It was among the first of the American temperance plays, and remained the most popular of them until it was eclipsed in 1858 by T. S. Arthur's Ten Nights in a Bar-Room.

The primary writer of the play was William Henry Smith (1806-1872), who also directed and starred in the original production in Boston in the 1844–45 season. Smith was the stage manager at Moses Kimball's Boston Museum, where the play was originally produced. An anonymous collaborator co-wrote the script. A commonly held theory identifies Unitarian minister John Pierpont as the unnamed collaborator. Pierpont's motive to remain anonymous may have been rooted in the desire to avoid affiliation with the theatre, which was considered a taboo subject in the Christian community.

The play ran for an unprecedented 140 performances in the Boston Museums' 1844–45 season, sometimes running three times a day. This was astonishing at the time. The success of the play led to the beginning of the temperance movement's success.

In the 20th and 21st centuries

A production of The Drunkard opened at the Theatre Mart in Los Angeles in 1933 and ran for 36 years.  At one point, Boris Karloff suggested adding an olio, a musical number following the performance, played in front of an olio drop.

The dated melodrama of Smith's play made it a target of parody in films. In 1934, a production of The Drunkard was featured to comic effect in the W. C. Fields film The Old Fashioned Way. The following year, James Murray and Clara Kimball Young starred in a film called The Drunkard, a comedy-drama in which two theatrical producers present the play as a farce with their needy relatives in the cast.<ref>{{IMDb title|0132929|The Drunkard (1935)}}</ref> In 1940, Buster Keaton starred in another film parody, The Villain Still Pursued Her.

A musical adaptation of the play by the British writer Brian J. Burton, The Drunkard or Down With the Demon Drink'', was published in 1968 and has been performed several times since.

Another version of the play, adapted by Richard Mansfield Dickinson, has been performed every Saturday night beginning on November 14, 1953 at the Tulsa Spotlight Theatre, located in Tulsa, Oklahoma; the company claims that this is the longest-running stage production in the world, although the run of The Mousetrap at the Theatre Royal, Nottingham in London has been running since October 6, 1952. Because of the show's longevity, the Tulsa Spotlight Theatre was placed on the U.S. National Register of Historic Places in 2001.

An Off-Broadway run of the play was produced at the Metropolitan Playhouse in New York City in 2010.

Plot 
Act 1 opens on a lovely rural cottage occupied by the tenants Mrs. Wilson and her daughter Mary. They are terrified of losing the cottage because they are unable to make regular payments and they are speaking to Lawyer Cribbs who insists they will because the new landlord, Edward Middleton, is not as generous as his father was. Cribbs is lying to them because he is managing the estate of Edward's late father and has an opportunity to sell the cottage and land for quite a healthy sum. However, when Edward meets Mary he falls in love with her and they get married. Also in act 1 there is a scene between Edward's foster brother William and Miss Spindle who is in love with Edward.

Act 2 begins with a furious Cribbs trying to get revenge on Edward for thwarting his sale by testing the jealous Miss Spindle to see if she might have a case against Edward. Upon discovering she has nothing of substance he switches tactics and decides that since Edward has been known to drink some in the past, perhaps he can be made to drink too much. Edward and Mary have a daughter now, young Julia, but that doesn't stop Cribbs. He convinces Edward to drink too much brandy at the local tavern and then spreads the rumor that Edward has fallen and is a no-good drunk. On the night that Edward first returns to the cottage drunk, Mrs. Wilson is found dead and Edward blames himself. He flees the cottage and runs to Boston (New York in later scripts).

Act 3 Starts with Cribbs finding Edward in the city to gloat and enact another money making scheme. Cribbs wants the fallen Edward to forge the name of one Arden Rencelaw, a wealthy philanthropist, in exchange for money to fuel his drinking habits. Showing goodness still, Edward refuses, but goes off to continue drinking in the city. In desperate search for William, Mary and Julia have also gone to the city. They are starving and cold when Cribbs stumbles upon them and tries to have his way with Mary. Luckily, William shows up at the perfect time to stop the assault, and then he swears to help find his foster brother.

William finds Edward at the top of Act 4 and along with Arden Rencelaw's help he convinces Edward to return to his family and stop wallowing in self pity. There is a happy family reunion for the Middletons. Before this happens, though, another complication arises as it is discovered that Cribbs forged Mr. Rencelaw's signature himself and is skipping town with $5,000 of his money.

Act 5 begins with a return to the village as Cribbs attempts to gather up incriminating evidence before making his escape. The real will of Edward's father which does not name Cribbs as the caretaker of the estate is hidden back at the cottage. The Middletons, Mr. Rencelaw, and William have figured this out, however, and they head him off at the cottage with the will in their possession. Lawyer Cribbs is promptly arrested. The final scene of the play is a picturesque, dialogue free scene in the interior of the cottage with everyone gathered around as a big happy family.

Characters and 1844 cast

Edward Middleton played by Mr. W. H. Smith
Lawyer Cribbs played by Mr. G. H. Wyatt
William Dowton played by Mr. C. W. Hunt
Farmer Gates played by Mr. C. H. Saunders
Farmer Stevens played by Mr. G. Howard
Old Johnson played by Mr. G. E. Locke 
Sam played by Mr. S. Adams
First Loafer played by Mr. J. Adams
Second Loafer played by Mr. Thompson
Mr. Rencelaw played by Mr. G. C. Germon
Landlord played by Mr. Harris
Bar Keeper played by Mr. Willard
Watchman played by Mr. Coad
Mary Wilson played by Mrs. G. C. Germon
Agnes Dowton, a Maniac played by Mrs. Thoman
Mrs. Wilson played by Mrs. Woodward
Patience played by Mrs. C. W. Hunt 
Julia played by Miss A. Phillips
Villagers, Loafers, Watchmen, &c.

See also

 American Temperance Society
 Boston Museum
 Federal Theatre Project
 Olio (musical number)
 P. T. Barnum
 Riverside Studio
 Temperance movement

References
Notes

External links
 Spotlight Theater website
 Metropolitan Playhouse website

1844 plays
American plays
Temperance movement